Earthquakes in East Timor are frequent but rarely cause damage. The earthquakes occur due to a convergent boundary between the Indo-Australian Plate and the Eurasian Plate. Earthquakes near East Timor will also be listed.

Earthquakes

References

East Timor
East Timor
East Timor
Earthquakes
Earthquakes
Earthquakes